East Washington Street Historic District is a national historic district located at South Bend, St. Joseph County, Indiana.  It encompasses 71 contributing buildings and 1 contributing structure in a predominantly residential section of South Bend. It developed between about 1880 and 1947, and includes notable examples of Italianate, Colonial Revival, American Foursquare, and Bungalow / American Craftsman style architecture and works by architects Austin & Shambleau. Notable buildings include the James and Marie Zimmerman House (1921), Eger House (1911), George and Emma Hewitt House (1905), Ruth and Edwin H. Sommerer House (1930), Chauncey T. Fassett House (1898), Dougdale Carriage Barn (1900), and Sunnyside Presbyterian Church (1923, 1951).

It was listed on the National Register of Historic Places in 1999.

References

Historic districts on the National Register of Historic Places in Indiana
Italianate architecture in Indiana
Colonial Revival architecture in Indiana
Historic districts in South Bend, Indiana
National Register of Historic Places in St. Joseph County, Indiana